FAST – Fighting Antisemitism Together was a Canadian human rights group founded in 2005 that described itself as "a coalition of non-Jewish Canadian community and business leaders dedicated to speaking out against humanity's oldest hatred."

FAST was founded by Elizabeth and Tony Comper, former CEO and President of BMO Financial. The organization was unique in that its leadership was not Jewish.  In 2021, FAST merged into the Canadian Institute for the Study of Antisemitism (CISA), a scholarly organization that publishes the academic journal Antisemitism Studies.

FAST created two human rights educational programs, that were offered online at no cost to educators and the public:

1. Choose Your Voice, a series of lesson plans and videos curriculum-based for students in Grades 6, 7 and 8

2. Voices into Action, a teaching resource with 6 units and 36 videos, curriculum-based for grades 9 to 12 and also used by colleges, universities and adult education centres

Both programs were developed by curriculum experts at OISE-UT and teach people about the dangers of racism and intolerance. FAST won Awards of Excellence from the Canadian Race Relations Foundation in 2010 for Choose Your Voice and in 2016 for Voices into Action. 

These programs have been expanded to include many subjects related to human rights and are now offered under the banner of CISA's human rights program.

References

External links
 Canadian Institute for the Study of Antisemitism (CISA)
Choose Your Voice
Voices into Action

Anti-racist organizations in Canada
Antisemitism in Canada
2005 establishments in Canada
Human rights organizations based in Canada
Organizations established in 2005
Opposition to antisemitism in North America
Centers for the study of antisemitism